Ernest M. Richardson, CM (born August 4, 1931) is a four-time Canadian and world curling champion. Richardson mainly curled with his brother and two cousins, until an injury forced him to replace one of his cousins.  He was nicknamed "The King", and has been inducted into the World Curling Federation Hall of Fame, the Canadian Sports Hall of Fame and the Saskatchewan Sports Hall of Fame.

Playing career

Richardson was the skip of the Regina-based team made up of his brother Garnet and cousins Arnold and Wes during the late 1950s and early 1960s.  In 1963, Wes Richardson was suffering from back issues, and was replaced on the team by Mel Perry.  The team was dominant on the Canadian curling scene during this time.  Starting in 1959, Richardson's team won the Canadian Championship four times in five years and captured four World Championships.  With their first victory in 1959, they were the youngest team to win the Brier at the time.

In 1978, in recognition of his contributions to the sport of curling, Ernie Richardson was made a member of the Order of Canada. Along with his brother and cousins, he was elected to the Saskatchewan Sports Hall of Fame, Canada's Sports Hall of Fame (1968) and the Canadian Curling Hall of Fame (1973). Richardson was also awarded the World Curling Freytag Award in 2000.  Later, when the World Curling Federation changed their criteria for honouring individuals, Richardson was inducted into the WCF Hall of Fame, along with all other previous award recipients.

Personal life
Richardson was nicknamed "The King" due to his early and frequent success as a curler.  After his retirement, Richardson authored several books on curling.  Richardson was married.  With his wife, Rikki, he had five children.  He is a fan of the Saskatchewan Roughriders.  After his retirement from curling, Richardson started a lighting business that his family still operates.

References

External links
 

1931 births
Living people
Curlers from Saskatchewan
Members of the Order of Canada
World curling champions
Brier champions
Canadian male curlers
20th-century Canadian people